Banff railway station was the railway station serving the town of Banff, Banffshire.  The line from  opened in 1859 and a temporary terminus opened on 30 July 1859.  A permanent station opened the following year.  As originally built there was a single platform and a goods line through to the quayside at Banff harbour but this was cut back prior to 1900 when a second platform line was constructed.

The Great North of Scotland Railway (GNoS) took over the line in 1867 and operated it until grouping in 1923.  Passing into British Railways ownership in 1948, the line was, like the rest of the former GNoS lines along the Moray coast, considered for closure as part of the Beeching report and closure notices were issued in 1963.  Passenger services were withdrawn in 1964 and the entire line, including Banff station, finally closed in 1968.

References
Notes

Sources

Disused railway stations in Aberdeenshire
Former Great North of Scotland Railway stations
Railway stations in Great Britain opened in 1860
Railway stations in Great Britain closed in 1968
Beeching closures in Scotland
Banff, Aberdeenshire
1860 establishments in Scotland
1968 disestablishments in Scotland